The 8th Carrier Air Group of the Fleet Air Arm was formed on 30 June 1945. It was based on the aircraft carrier  for service in the British Pacific Fleet and contained 828 Naval Air Squadron flying the Grumman TBF Avenger, 801 Naval Air Squadron and 880 Naval Air Squadron flying the Supermarine Seafire and 1771 Naval Air Squadron flying the Fairey Firefly. It was disbanded in April 1946, but some of its squadrons disbanded earlier.

See also
 List of Fleet Air Arm groups

References

Citations

Bibliography

Fleet Air Arm groups
Military units and formations established in 1945
Military units and formations disestablished in 1946